The Leineschloss (English: Leine Palace), situated on the Leine in Hanover, Germany, is the former residence of the Hanoverian dukes, electors and kings. Currently it is the seat of the Landtag of Lower Saxony.

The first building on the site was a Franciscan friary, constructed in about 1300, which was abandoned in 1533 after the Protestant Reformation. In 1636, George, Duke of Brunswick-Lüneburg, began construction of a rather small late renaissance palace on the site as his residence. Elector Ernest Augustus had it enlarged and modernized and added a theatre in the late 17th century. In 1742 the north-west wing was renewed. Between 1816 and 1844, the architect Georg Ludwig Friedrich Laves fully re-built the palace. The column portico with six Corinthian columns was built during this period.

During World War II, the Leineschloss burnt out entirely after Allied aerial raids. King George I of Great Britain was originally buried in the Chapel of the Leineschloss, but his remains, along with his parents', were moved to the 19th-century mausoleum of King Ernest Augustus in the Berggarten of Herrenhausen Palace after World War II.  Architect Dieter Oesterlen re-built the palace between 1957 and 1962.

In August 2016 bones were found in the Leineschloss during a renovation project; it was believed that the bones were the remains of Philip Christoph von Königsmarck, the lover of the wife of the later king George I of Great Britain who was killed there in July, 1694. However, subsequent tests proved that some of the bones were from animals, while the human bones came from at least five different skeletons. None have been proven to belong to Königsmarck.

See also
 Burial places of British royalty

References

External links 

Palaces in Lower Saxony
Buildings and structures in Hanover
Burial sites of the House of Hanover
Government buildings completed in 1844
German Landtag buildings